100% was a South Korean boy band formed by Shinhwa's Andy Lee under TOP Media in 2012. The group debuted in September 2012 with their single "We, 100%". The group consisted a total of seven members: Minwoo, Rockhyun, Jonghwan, Chanyong, Changbum, Hyukjin and Sanghoon. Throughout their career, Sanghoon took time off from the group since 2014, Changbum departed from the group in 2016 while Minwoo died in March 2018 due to cardiac arrest. The group disbanded on October 9, 2021 after the members' contracts expired.

Career

Pre-debut
In 2009, Rockhyun—under the stage name Rocky—was in Andy Lee's duo Jumper along with Park Dong-min that released two singles: "Yes!" featuring Eric of Shinhwa and "Dazzling" featuring Kang Ji-young.

The same year, Minwoo was featured during Andy Lee's promotion for his song "Single Man," along with Park Dong-min. Minwoo had also been active as an actor. He starred in KBS2's 2006 drama Sharp 3, SBS's 2007 drama The King and I and in two movies, Crazy Waiting (2007) and Where Are You Going? (2009).

2012–2013: Debut and sub-unit
Between June and September 2012, 100% were featured in SBS MTV's variety show Teen Top Rising 100%, in which they starred alongside fellow TOP Media artist Teen Top and its founder Andy Lee. Their debut single "We, 100%" was released on September 18. It consists of four tracks, including the instrumental version of "Bad Boy," which were all written and produced by Super Changddai. The same day, the music video for its lead track "Bad Boy" went online on the band's official YouTube channel. 100% made their live debut of "Bad Boy" on September 21 on KBS Music Bank, followed by MBC Music Core and SBS Inkigayo that same weekend.

On October 23, MBC held a press conference for 100% and Teen Top's second variety program in Jangan-dong, Seoul. Teen Top & 100% Rising Brothers premiered on MBC Music three days later, showing the two groups accomplishing missions. The group's first digital single "Guy Like Me", written by Minigun and Super Changddai, was released on December 7 along with its music video.

100% released their first extended play Real 100% and a music video for "Want U Back" on May 23, 2013. On July 17, the group's official fanclub, Perfection (퍼펙션), was announced by TOP Media. 100% V, a sub-unit consisting of Rockhyun, Jonghwan, and Hyukjin along with rapper Chanyong, was announced by TOP Media on November 14. The sub-unit released a single consisting of lead track "Missing You" (퇴근길) and two others on November 20. They made their first live performance on Music Bank.

2014–2016: Minwoo's military service and lineup changes
In February 2014, TOP Media announced on both 100%'s official website and fancafe that leader Minwoo had to enlist in the Korean military starting on March 4. In March, the agency announced that Sanghoon will take some personal time off until he finalizes on what to do in the future. With five members remaining, 100% released their second extended play Bang the Bush and music video for "심장이 뛴다 (Beat)" on March 17, 2014.

On September 12, 2016, TOP Media made an official announcement that Changbum had left the group. The remaining members would continue as five and prepare for a comeback in October. 100% released their third extended play Time Leap and a music video for "지독하게 (Better Day)" on October 13, 2016.

2017–2019: Japanese debut, The Unit, Minwoo's death, Sunshine, RE:tro, and military service
100% making their Japanese debut with released single "How to Cry" in January 2017. The group later released their fourth mini album Sketchbook on February 22 with the title track "Sketch U." On June 28, 100% released their second Japanese single "Warrior". In October 2017, it was confirmed all members of 100% would be competed in The Unit. Member Rockhyun and Hyukjin passed the audition. Hyukjin was eliminated in 34th place due the second elimination round while Rockhyun did not enter on TOP9 and only finished in 14th place due the final round.

100% released their third Japanese single "Song for You" on February 14, 2018. On March 25, 2018 it was reported that Minwoo had died from cardiac arrest at his home at the age of 33. On April 2, 2018, it was announced that 100% would resume career and their mini tour announced before Minwoo's death. 100% released their fourth Japanese single "Summer Night" on June 27, 2018.
On July 26, 100% made their first Korean comeback in over a year and a half with the digital single "Grand Bleu", then they announced the fifth mini album release Sunshine, with title track named "Heart" ("맘").

100% carried on with their Japanese promotion and released their fifth Japanese single "28°C". After that they held "Walking On The Clouds" concerts from January 25–27, 2019.

100% released their fifth mini album RE:tro on March 14, 2019 and promoted their comeback in Korea.

On June 25, it was announced all four members would be enlisting during the latter half of the year. Rockhyun and Chanyong enlisted on July 15, Jonghwan on July 22, and Hyukjin on August 26.

2021: Disbandment
On September 23, 2021, TOP Media announced that 100% would disband after the expiration of their contracts on October 9.

On September 27, before their disbandment, they released their last single "Beautiful Girl".

Members
Adapted from the official website:

Former
 Minwoo (민우)
 Rockhyun (Hangul: 록현)
 Jonghwan (종환)
 Chanyong (찬용)
 Changbum (창범)
 Hyukjin (혁진)
 Sanghoon (상훈)

Discography

Extended plays

Singles

Videography

Music videos

Filmography

Television

Concerts and tours

Tours

Concerts

Showcases

References

External links

  

K-pop music groups
South Korean boy bands
South Korean dance music groups
Musical groups established in 2012
2012 establishments in South Korea
Musical groups disestablished in 2021
2021 disestablishments in South Korea